Tigranella is a genus of longhorn beetles of the subfamily Lamiinae, containing the following species:

 Tigranella mirabilis Breuning, 1940
 Tigranella vieui Breuning, 1965

References

Pteropliini